NCAA GameBreaker 2000 is a video game developed by Red Zone Entertainment and published by 989 Sports for the PlayStation in 1999. The game featured former UCLA Bruins quarterback Cade McNown on the cover.

Reception

The game received "favorable" reviews according to the review aggregation website GameRankings.

References

External links
 

1999 video games
College football video games
NCAA video games
North America-exclusive video games
PlayStation (console) games
PlayStation (console)-only games
Video games developed in the United States
Video games set in 2000